is a female Japanese lyricist from Kanagawa Prefecture. Inoue writes the majority of songs recorded by T.M.Revolution, Takanori Nishikawa’s solo project, as well as for other artists produced by Daisuke Asakura.

External links
 

Japanese women musicians
Japanese musicians
Living people
Musicians from Kanagawa Prefecture
People from Kanagawa Prefecture
Year of birth missing (living people)
Japanese songwriters